”Liking What You See: A Documentary” is a science fiction novelette by American writer Ted Chiang, published in the 2002 collection Stories of Your Life and Others.

Plot summary
The novelette examines the cultural effects of a noninvasive medical procedure that induces a visual agnosia toward physical beauty. The story is told as a series of interviews about a reversible procedure called calliagnosia, which eliminates a person's ability to perceive physical beauty. The story's central character is Tamera Lyons, a first-year student who grew up with calliagnosia but wants to experience life without it.

Awards

Chiang turned down a Hugo nomination for this story in 2003, on the grounds that the novelette was rushed due to editorial pressure and did not turn out as he had really wanted.

Film adaptation
On 29 July 2017, Deadline reported that AMC announced a script based on "Liking What You See: A Documentary" is under development to create a TV series. Eric Heisserer is to be an executive producer.

See also
 Fregoli delusion, a rare psychiatric disorder.

References

External links 
 

Science fiction short stories
2002 short stories
Short stories by Ted Chiang